The Vétéran was a 74-gun ship of the line of the French Navy. The pair, both built by Pierre Ozanne at Brest to the plans of Jacques-Noël Sané, were enlarged to carry an upper deck battery of 24-pounder long guns instead of the 18-pounders used on the standard ships of the Téméraire class.

Ordered as Magnanime, she was renamed Quatorze Juillet on 7 May 1798, and  Vétéran  on 6 December 1802.

On 13 December 1805, she departed Brest under captain Jérôme Bonaparte, as part of Willaumez division, to participate in what became the Atlantic campaign of 1806.

The 1806 Great Coastal hurricane scattered the division and Vétéran found herself isolated. She cruised off Quebec, destroying merchantmen and skirmishing with Royal Navy forces. She eventually returned to France and evaded the British blockade, entering  Concarneau thanks to the experience of a sailor who had been a fisherman in the region. However, she ended up trapped, unable to leave the harbour for years. At some point before 1812 she fled to Lorient.

In 1812, she took part in Allemand's escape from Lorient. She then sailed to Brest under Captain Jurien de Lagravière.

She was decommissioned in 1833, and broken up in 1842.

Citations

Sources and references
 Ships of the line

Veteran
Veteran
1803 ships
Ships built in France
Concarneau